This list of cemeteries in Connecticut includes currently operating, historical (closed for new interments), and defunct (graves abandoned or removed) cemeteries, columbaria, and mausolea which are historical and/or notable. It does not include pet cemeteries.

Fairfield County 
 Adath Israel Cemetery, Fairfield
 Adath Yeshuren Cemetery, Fairfield
 Agudath Shalom Cemetery, Stamford
 B’nai Israel Cemetery, Fairfield
 B’nai Israel Cemetery, Danbury
 B’nai Israel Cemetery, Monroe
 B’nai Israel Cemetery, Shelton
 Center Cemetery, Bethel
 Central Cemetery, Brookfield
 Congregational Church Cemetery, Bethel
 East Cemetery, Fairfield
 East Norwalk Historical Cemetery, Norwalk
 Elmwood Cemetery, Bethel
 Fairfield Memorial Park, Stamford
 Great Plain Cemetery, Danbury
 Gregory's Four Corners Burial Ground, Trumbull
 Independent Hebrew Cemetery, Norwalk
 Laurel Hill Cemetery, Brookfield
 Long Ridge Union Cemetery, Stamford
 Loyalty Cemetery, Fairfield
 Memorial Garden of The Unitarian Church, Westport
 Mill Hill Burying Ground, Norwalk
 Mountain Grove Cemetery, Bridgeport
 Oak Lawn Cemetery, Fairfield
 Pine Island Cemetery, Norwalk
 Rodeph Sholom Cemetery, Fairfield
 Riverside Cemetery, Norwalk
 Roxbury Cemetery, Stamford
 St. John's Cemetery, Norwalk
 St. Mary's Cemetery, Bethel
 St. Mary's Cemetery, Norwalk
 St. Mary's Church Cemetery, Bethel
 St. Paul's On the Green Cemetery, Norwalk
 St. Rose Cemetery, Newtown
 Stepney Cemetery, Monroe
 Stoney Hill Cemetery, Bethel
 Umpawaug Cemetery, Redding
 Union Cemetery, Easton
 Union Cemetery, Norwalk
 Willowbrook Cemetery, Westport

Hartford County 
 Ancient Burying Ground, Hartford
 Buckland Cemetery, Manchester
 Cedar Hill Cemetery, Hartford
 Century Cemetery, Marlborough
 East Cemetery, Manchester
 Enfield Street Cemetery, Enfield
 Glastonbury Green Cemetery, Glastonbury
 Green Cemetery, Glastonbury
 Old Eastbury Cemetery, Glastonbury
 Old Wethersfield Village Cemetery, Wethersfield
 Seventh Day Baptist Cemetery, Burlington
 South Burying Ground, Kensington, Berlin
 West Cemetery, Manchester

Litchfield County 
 Abbey of Regina Laudis Cemetery, Bethlehem
 Judea Cemetery, Washington
 New Milford Center Cemetery, New Milford
 Old North Road Burying Ground, (also known as Winchester Cemetery), Winsted
 Roxbury Center Cemetery, Roxbury
 Sons of Jacob Cemetery, Torrington
 Townhill Cemetery, New Hartford

Middlesex County 
 Ackley Cemetery, East Haddam
 Bashan Lake Cemetery, East Haddam
 Cove Cemetery, Hadlyme North Historic District, East Haddam
 Cypress Cemetery, Old Saybrook
 Foxtown Cemetery, East Haddam
 Hog Hill Cemetery, East Hampton
 Indian Hill Cemetery, Middletown
 Millington Cemetery, East Haddam
 Moodus Cemetery, East Haddam
 Mortimer Cemetery, Middletown
 Old Cove Cemetery, East Haddam
 Riverside Cemetery, Middletown
 Riverside Cemetery, Old Saybrook
 River View Cemetery, East Haddam
 Tater Hill Cemetery, East Haddam
 Warner Cemetery, East Haddam

New Haven County 
 Beth Shalom Cemetery, Orange
 Evergreen Cemetery, New Haven
 Great Hill Cemetery, Seymour
 Grove Street Cemetery, New Haven
 Gunntown Cemetery, Naugatuck
 Milford Cemetery, Milford
 Olde Uptown Burial Ground (also known as Colonial Cemetery), Derby - historians believe this may be the oldest public cemetery in the US
 Orange Center Cemetery, Orange
 Paugassett Burial Grounds (also known as Paugussett Settlement Site), Ansonia (formerly Derby)
 Pine Grove Cemetery, Ansonia
St. Michael's Cemetery, Derby
Saint John Catholic Cemetery, Wallingford
Saint Lawrence Cemetery, West Haven

New London County 
 Almshouse Cemetery, Norwich
 Antientest Burial Ground, New London
 Avery Cemetery, Preston
 Avery Morgan Burying Ground, Groton
 Brewster's Neck Cemetery, Preston
 Col Ledyard Cemetery, Groton
 Duck River Cemetery, Old Lyme
 Exeter Cemetery, Lebanon
 Goshen Cemetery, Lebanon
 Guiles Stafford Cemetery, Preston
 Johnson Cemetery, Bozrah
 Linwood Cemetery, Colchester
 Long Society Congregational Burying Ground, Preston
 New Poquetanuck Cemetery, Preston
 Oak Street Cemetery, Norwich
 Old Burial Ground, Colchester
 Old Kinne Burying Ground, Griswold
 Old Norwichtown Cemetery, Norwich
 Old Poquetanuck Cemetery, Preston
 Pachaug Cemetery, Griswold
 Packer Cemetery, Groton
 Palmer Cemetery, Preston
 Pautipaug Cemetery, Franklin
 Plains Cemetery, Franklin
 Preston City Cemetery, Preston
 Rixtown Cemetery, Griswold
 St. Joseph's Cemetery, Norwich
 St. Mary's Cemetery, Norwich
 Stone Church Cemetery, East Lyme
 Trumbull Cemetery, Lebanon
 Whitehall Cemetery, Mystic

Tolland County 
 Andover Road Cemetery, Hebron
 Bolton Center Cemetery, Bolton
 Center Cemetery, Somers
 Ellington Center Cemetery, Ellington
 Gilead Cemetery, Hebron
 Godfrey Hill Cemetery, Hebron
 Grant Hill Cemetery, Coventry
 Jones Street Cemetery, Hebron
 Mansfield Center Cemetery, Mansfield
 Nathan Hale Cemetery, Coventry
 New Storrs Cemetery, Mansfield 
 Old Andover Cemetery, Andover 
 Olde Mansfield Center Cemetery, Mansfield 
 Old Storrs Cemetery, Mansfield 
 Old Willington Hill Cemetery, Willington 
 Old Yard Cemetery, Columbia 
 Pink Ravine Cemetery, Mansfield 
 Quarryville Cemetery, Bolton 
 South Cemetery, Tolland 
 St. Peter's Cemetery, Hebron 
 Silver Street Cemetery, Coventry 
 Skungamaug Cemetery, Tolland 
 South Street Cemetery, Coventry 
 Townsend Cemetery, Andover 
 Union Center Cemetery, Union

Windham County 
 Abington Cemetery, Pomfret
 Aspinwall Cemetery, Putnam
 Bara-Hack Cemetery, Pomfret
 Bungay Cemetery, Woodstock
 East Woodstock Cemetery, Woodstock
 Litchfield Cemetery, Hampton
 New South Killingly Cemetery, Killingly
 North Cemetery, Hampton
 Old Cemetery, Eastford
 Old Scotland Cemetery North, Scotland
 Old South Killingly Cemetery, Killingly
 Palmertown Cemetery, Scotland
 Plainfield Cemetery, Plainfield
 South Cemetery, Brooklyn
 South Cemetery, Hampton
 South Cemetery, Pomfret
 Snow Cemetery, Ashford
 Swamp Burying Ground, Ashford
 Warrenville Cemetery, Ashford
 West Thompson Cemetery, Thompson
 Westford Hill Cemetery, Ashford
 Windham Center Cemetery, Windham
 Woodstock Hill Cemetery, Woodstock
 Woodward Cemetery, Ashford

See also
 List of cemeteries in the United States

References

 
Connecticut